Zuleyka Jerrís Mendoza Rivera (born October 3, 1987) is a Puerto Rican actress, TV host, dancer, model and beauty queen who won Miss Universe 2006 in Los Angeles. She was previously crowned Miss Puerto Rico Universe 2006. She made her debut as a telenovela actress in Mexico's Telemundo's soap opera Dame Chocolate in 2007, which was followed by several other soap opera roles. In 2017 she appeared in the music video for "Despacito" by Luis Fonsi.

Early life
Born in Cayey, she was raised in Salinas by her parents Jerry Rivera and Carmen Mendoza, and two brothers, Jerry, Jr. and Jose Rivera Mendoza.
Prior to winning the Miss Puerto Rico title she won the local pageant for her hometown of Salinas. She had also placed as the first runner-up in the Miss Teen Puerto Rico pageant. Only eighteen years of age when she was crowned Miss Universe, Rivera is one of the youngest women to win the title.

Pageantry

Miss Puerto Rico Universe 2006
Rivera represented her hometown of Salinas municipality at Miss Puerto Rico Universe 2006, held on November 10, 2005, where she was crowned the winner by outgoing titleholder and Miss Universe 2005 1st Runner-Up Cynthia Olavarría. Rivera is also the second woman with noticeably mixed features to win Miss Puerto Rico Universe after Alba Reyes in 2004.

Miss Universe 2006
Zuleyka Rivera represented Puerto Rico in the Miss Universe 2006 which was televised live internationally from the Shrine Auditorium in Los Angeles, California on 23 July 2006. After competing in swimsuit, evening gown and interview, she was crowned Miss Universe by outgoing titleholder Natalie Glebova of Canada. At the time she was the youngest Miss Universe winner since Amelia Vega in 2003 (until Stefanía Fernández in 2009).

Later that evening, Rivera fainted briefly during a press appearance. The incident was reportedly attributed to heat exhaustion (from the stage lights) coupled with the weight of the heavy, chained dress she was wearing.

Rivera was the fifth Puerto Rican to win the title, which makes the island the third most successful entity in the pageant (behind the United States and Venezuela). Rivera was the third consecutive delegate from Puerto Rico to make the Top 5 at Miss Universe, after Alba Reyes placed 2nd Runner-Up in 2004 and Cynthia Olavarría placed 1st Runner-Up in 2005. She is also the first winner from Puerto Rico to have noticeable mixed (African and Indigenous) heritage features, different from her four predecessors (Marisol Malaret, Deborah Carthy-Deu, Dayanara Torres, and Denise Quiñones) that have distinctly European features.

Rivera's win came only five years after Denise Quiñones, the most recent winner from Puerto Rico, won the crown. As Miss Universe, Rivera represented the Miss Universe Organization, both in the United States and internationally. She was based in New York City, where she shared an apartment with Tara Conner, Miss USA and Katie Blair, Miss Teen USA 2006.

At the Miss Universe 2007 pageant she passed her crown to Riyo Mori of Japan in Mexico City, Mexico on May 28, 2007. Her Miss Universe's reign with only 10 months is one of the shortest reign in the history of the contest.

Reign
After being crowned on July 23, 2006, in Los Angeles, Zuleyka was interviewed by many news teams in Los Angeles and when she arrived at her new home in New York.

From the end of July until early August, Zuleyka traveled to Japan where she presented the Five Star Diamond Award to the Mandarin Oriental Hotel in Tokyo. She also participated in a photo shoot with Kurara Chibana in San Juan, Puerto Rico and in Tokyo, Japan. Miss Universe Japan (and first runner-up), and Zuleyka also visited Mikimoto, the creators of her dazzling crown. In late August, Zuleyka traveled to Indonesia where she attended the opening of a new spa, met with the Minister of Culture, and attended the Miss Indonesia Universe pageant where Agni Pratistha was crowned. While in Indonesia, Zuleyka also visited Bali. On September 4, 2006, Zuleyka returned to her home, Puerto Rico for an official homecoming celebration and parade. The following day, Zuleyka returned to her hometown of Salinas.

As of April 2007, Zuleyka has traveled to the Czech Republic, France, Italy, Russia, Spain, Turkey, Greece, Kazakhstan, India, Mexico, Thailand, Brazil, Puerto Rico, Japan, and Indonesia, in addition to numerous trips around the United States.

On April 1, 2007, Rivera appeared at WrestleMania 23 along with Miss USA 2007 Rachel Smith and Miss Teen USA 2006 Katie Blair, supporting Donald Trump in the Battle of the Billionaires match against Vince McMahon.

She passed on her crown to Japan's Riyo Mori at the Miss Universe 2007 pageant, which was held in Mexico City, Mexico on May 28, 2007.

Acting career
After finishing her reign as Miss Universe, Rivera expressed her interest in an acting career. She debuted in the 2007 telenovela Dame Chocolate with Carlos Ponce and Karla Monroig. In 2010, she was offered the role of antagonist Rocío Lynch in the telenovela Alguien Te Mira. Later that year, she starred in Aurora as another antagonist, Diana del Valle.

After a brief hiatus due to her pregnancy, Rivera returned to acting in 2012, with a lead role in Rosario. Rivera again plays the role of antagonist Sandra Díaz. In an interview, Rivera said that she has acknowledged she has "the skills for this kind of [antagonist] roles... I handle them pretty well." In 2013, Rivera announced she would play the antagonist lead in the upcoming telenovela Cosita linda, which will start filming in May.

Rivera also had a small role on the film Runner, Runner.

Personal life
From late 2010 to 2013, Rivera dated Dallas Mavericks point guard J. J. Barea. In July 2011, the couple announced they were expecting their first child together.<ref>[http://content.usatoday.com/communities/gameon/post/2011/07/jj-barea-miss-universe-zuleyka-rivera-pregnant/1 Baby due for J.J. Barea and his Miss Universe girlfriend] from USA Today 21 July 2011</ref> Rivera gave birth to her son Sebastián José Barea Rivera in Minnesota on February 18, 2012. Barea was present during the birth.

During early 2013, there was much speculation that the relationship between Rivera and Barea had ended. However, she assured on an interview that they were still together. On April 18, 2013, Barea released a statement confirming that the relationship was over. Rivera responded with a statement of her own alleging "false information" on Barea's statement. On her statement, Rivera says that "ever since I began filming the telenovela Rosario'', there weren't two consecutive weeks where I didn't travel to Minnesota, a place I considered my home, along with the father of my child." She added that she still has the satisfaction "as a woman and mother, that I gave all of me in exchange for our happiness. But this is a labor of two. Life goes on and I keep on going with my head held high."

In 2018, Rivera became a brand ambassador for Eravos.

Filmography

Films

Television

Music videos

See also
 List of Puerto Ricans
 History of women in Puerto Rico
 Miss Universe 2006
 Miss Puerto Rico Universe 2006

References

External links

 An Interview with Zuleyka prior to her winning Miss Universe 2006
 Miss Universe official website
 
 Zuleuka Rivera

1987 births
Living people
People from Cayey, Puerto Rico
Miss Universe winners
Miss Universe 2006 contestants
Miss Puerto Rico winners
Puerto Rican female models
Puerto Rican telenovela actresses
21st-century Puerto Rican actresses
Puerto Rican beauty pageant winners
Puerto Rican people of indigenous peoples descent